At the Heart of It All is the eleventh studio album by Celtic music band Capercaillie.

Track listing
 "S' Och A' Dhomhnaill Òig Ghaolaich (Waulking Song)"
 "The Strathspey Set"
 "Ailein Duinn Nach Till Thu An Taobh-Seo"
 "The Jura Wedding Reels"
 "At the Heart of It All"
 "Abu Chuibhl' (Spinning Song)"
 "The Marches"
 "Nighean Dubh Nighean Donn"
 "Fainne An Dochais (Ring of Hope)"
 "Cal's Jigs"
 "Lament for John 'Garve' MacLeod of Raasay"

Charts

References 

Capercaillie (band) albums
2013 albums
Scottish Gaelic music